Poyraz Karayel is a Turkish drama television series that was broadcast on Kanal D from 2015 to 2017. It stars İlker Kaleli as Poyraz Karayel and Burçin Terzioğlu as Ayşegül Umman. After its last episode aired on 1 March 2017, it broke records and became the best Turkish action series; it was so successful that they produced a movie of it, and in 2019 a book with which despite the restrictions due to the Covid-19 pandemic reached the highest number of figures in the publisher, more than 500,000 people were waiting in the outskirts and 2 million copies were sold in one day, so much so that that same day sales were even sold out on Amazon.

Plot

Season 1 
Poyraz meets Aysegul in a taxi and further in the episodes he falls in love with her. However he doesn't know that Aysegul is Bahri Umman's daughter, which although he finds out he decides not to tell Aysegul that he is working with her father. Further in season 1 Poyraz  finds out that the chief police 'Mumtaz' has  lied to him  and that it was Mumtaz's fault that he got blamed of committing a crime. He then also finds out that the person that gave Mumtaz the command to pull Poyraz in this trap was his father in law Unsal. In  the meantime Bahri Umman finds out that  his daughter and Poyraz are together, which leads to chaos.

Season 2 
In the second season of Poyraz Karayel, Poyraz's sister Meltem Karayel is introduced. Further in the season Poyraz and the other characters find out that the man that they know as Poyraz's dad is actually his step father. Poyraz then finds out that his actual father is Adil Topal and that Adil Topal is  Bahri Umman's enemy from 30 years ago. This then leads to Poyraz and the crew to get revenge from Adil Topal who dies soon in season 2. However the death of  Adil Topal doesn't leave the Umman household with a happy end as after Adil Topal's son, Poyraz's half brother Neset Topal, replaces his fathers place and starts to sell drugs abroad. He also has psychological problems and has a onesided love towards Aysegul. The second seasons carries on with Poyraz and his crew to stop and kill Neset, which they finally do. However, not everything  ends as they wish as at the end of season 2 Poyraz is shot dead.

Season 3 
Poyraz wasn't dead. He returns to Istanbul after being held hostage for two years by a terrorist group he had been investigating. He comes back right on the day of Aysegul's wedding. Things will take a strange turn, because both Poyraz and Aysegul feel like they have been betrayed by the other. After a series of arguments and confessions, the two of them reunite and Aysegul manages to get a divorce. They get engaged. Zulficar and Meltem eventually have three children, Aysegul is murdered by her former mother-in-law and Poyraz goes insane. Bahri dies a few months after Aysegul's death, leaving Sadretin as the head of the Istanbul mafia.

Ahmet Poyraz Karayel 
Poyraz Karayel
first appearance	Poyraz Karayel Episode 1
last view	Poyraz Karayel Episode 82
creator	Ethem Özışık
Uplifting	Ilker Kaleli
Date of birth 	17 May 1981
Information
Gender	Male
Profession	Police
Family	İsmail Karayel (stepfather) (died)
Adil Topal (father) (died)
Neşet Topal (brother) (died)
Meltem Karayel (brother)
Marriage(s)	Begum (ex-wife)
children	Sinan Karayel
He is the character played by İlker Kaleli . (1-82)

He was born on 17 May 1981. He is Adil Topal's son, Meltem's older brother, Neşet's brother, Sinan's father and Begüm's ex-wife. His middle name is Ahmet. When he was 3 years old, he was given to İsmail Karayel by a friend of his father along with his sister Meltem. Until the 39th episode of the series, Poyraz thought that his father was İsmail Karayel.

He spent his school years in a boarding school. In the first season of the series, Poyraz, who was a police officer in the Anti-Organized Crime and Anti-Smuggling Branch, was sentenced to prison for a slander and custody of his son was given to his ex-father-in-law, Ünsal.

After getting out of prison, Bahri starts working with Oman to both get custody of his son back and follow him, but leaves when it is revealed that he is a police officer. Poyraz, who was also the superintendent at the Organized Crime desk at the beginning of the second season, was later promoted to become the chief of police.

Although he is seen as the punk type by others, he is actually a very nice person. She complains that she has never seen love in her life. He is very fond of his son. He is also in love with Ayşegül, daughter of Bahri Oman. He resigned from the police in the 44th episode of the series. After leaving the police, he works for Bahri Oman. His worst enemy is his half-brother Neşet Topal, who reappeared years later.

In the last episode of the second season of the series, Poyraz Karayel played Neşet's game and killed the son of the Russian consul. Poyraz Karayel, who was shot during the conflict, was declared dead, but he was actually alive and was rescued by intelligence.

Poyraz, whom everyone thought to be dead, worked undercover for two years in the name of intelligence. Two years later, he reappeared at Ayşegül's wedding. In the final episode of the series, he could not stand Ayşegül's death and was hospitalized in a mental hospital.

Cast

Completed characters

Series overview

References

External links 
  
 

2015 Turkish television series debuts
Turkish drama television series
Kanal D original programming
Television series produced in Istanbul
Television shows set in Istanbul
Television series set in the 2010s